The Stepping Stone Purse was an American Thoroughbred horse race held annually in the latter part of April at Churchill Downs in Louisville, Kentucky. Open to three-year-old horses, it was, along with the Derby Trial Stakes, one of two final prep races hosted by Churchill Downs running up to the Kentucky Derby.

In 1959, Sword Dancer won the Stepping Stone Purse, then ran second in the Kentucky Derby before winning the Belmont Stakes. The following year, Bally Ache won this race  then ran second in the Derby but won the Preakness Stakes.  In 1969, future U.S. Racing Hall of Fame inductee Majestic Prince won this race by six lengths while setting a new stakes record and then won the Kentucky Derby and the Preakness Stakes. In 1974, Cannonade too won the Stepping Stone Purse and the Kentucky Derby  and 1965 winner Tom Rolfe went on to finish third in the Derby but then won the Preakness Stakes.

Records
Speed record
 1:21.60 – Majestic Prince (1969) (at 7 furlongs)
 1:37.40 – Nostalgia (1977) (at 8 furlongs)

Most wins by a jockey
 2 – Bill Shoemaker (1959, 1966)
 2 – Ismael Valenzuela (1962, 1964)
 2 – Manuel Ycaza (1963, 1968)

Most wins by a trainer
 2 – Woody Stephens (1963, 1974)

Most wins by an owner
 2 – Cain Hoy Stable (1963, 1968)

Winners

References

Discontinued horse races
Horse races in Kentucky
Flat horse races for three-year-olds
Churchill Downs horse races
Recurring sporting events established in 1958
1958 establishments in Kentucky
Recurring sporting events disestablished in 1981
1981 disestablishments in Kentucky